The 2020–21 Cymru South season (also known as the 2020–21 JD Cymru South season for sponsorship reasons) would have been the second season of the second-tier Southern region football in Welsh football pyramid.  Teams were play each other twice on a home and away basis.

Swansea University were the defending champions.  They were not promoted last season due to the fact that they did not meet FAW tier 1 guidelines.  Second placed Haverfordwest County were promoted instead. Because of the COVID-19 pandemic in Wales, this season was cancelled.

Teams
The league consists of 16 clubs.

Team Changes

To Cymru South
Promoted from Welsh Football League Division One
 Trefelin BGC
 Port Talbot Town
 Risca United

Relegated from Cymru Premier
 Carmarthen Town

From Cymru South
Promoted to Cymru Premier
 Haverfordwest County

Relegated to Ardal SW
 STM Sports
 Cwmamman United
 Caerau (Ely)

Stadia and Locations

Source: Cymru South Ground Information

Season overview
The Professional Registration Periods for the 2020–21 season were as follows:
The first period was to open on 27 July 2020 and was to close at midnight on 16 October 2020.
Dates for the second period were to be confirmed prior to the season's cancellation.
Past Summer transfers can be found here.

Since anti-COVID-19 restrictions were put in place by FAW, as from Monday 10 August 2020, clubs could have trained in groups of 15 and contact training was allowed at all-levels of football.  However, competitive and exhibition matches were still not allowed to take place. The FAW eventually cancelled the 2020–21 season on 18 March 2021 because Cymru North and South did not have their Elite Status designation reinstated by the National Sport Group.

League table

Results

Season statistics

Top scorers

League placing

Fair Play winner
The winner for each respective division's FAW Fair Play Table will be given £1,000 prize money and the FAW Fair Play Trophy.

External links
Football Association of Wales
Cymru South Football
Ardal Southern Twitter Page

References

2020–21 in Welsh football
Cymru South seasons
Wales